Sydney Albert William Fieldus  (27 May 1909 – April 1974) was an English footballer who played as a defender.

Early life
Fieldus was born in Romford, Essex on 27 May 1909.

Career
Fieldus began his career with both Clapton Orient and Brentford, before signing for Colchester United in 1937. He made 23 appearances in all competitions for the club, before the outbreak of World War II. During the war, he served as a Captain in the Essex Home Guard, being awarded an MBE for his efforts on 15 December 1944, whilst he also appeared for Clapton Orient, Southend United and Colchester Wanderers – a club formed by Fieldus who were disbanded upon the return of league football. Following the culmination of the war, Fieldus was instrumental in helping restart Colchester's footballing activities, serving the club as secretary-manager from June 1945 to April 1946. Following his time at Colchester, Fieldus appeared for Chelmsford City.

Later life and death
Fieldus died in Colchester in April 1974.

References

1909 births
1974 deaths
Association football defenders
English footballers
English football managers
Members of the Order of the British Empire
Footballers from Romford
Brentford F.C. players
Leyton Orient F.C. players
Colchester Town F.C. players
Colchester United F.C. players
Chelmsford City F.C. players
Southend United F.C. players
Colchester United F.C. managers
English Football League players
Southern Football League players
British Home Guard officers